A Marine expeditionary brigade (MEB) is a formation of the United States Marine Corps, a Marine air-ground task force of approximately 14,500 Marines and sailors constructed around a reinforced infantry regiment, a composite Marine aircraft group, a combat logistics regiment and a MEB command group. The MEB, commanded by a general officer (usually a brigadier general), is task-organized to meet the requirements of a specific situation. It can function as part of a joint task force, as the lead echelon of the Marine expeditionary force (MEF), or alone. It varies in size and composition, and is larger than a Marine expeditionary unit (MEU) but smaller than a MEF. The MEB is capable of conducting missions across the full range of military operations.

Notional Marine expeditionary brigade in 2010

Command element (CE)

MEB command group
MEB Staff
Detachment, Communications Battalion
Detachment, Intelligence Battalion
Detachment, Law Enforcement Battalion
Detachment, Radio Battalion
Detachment, Air Naval Gunfire Liaison Company
Detachment, Force Reconnaissance Company

Ground combat element (GCE)

Regimental Landing Team (RLT) or Regimental Combat Team (RCT)
Infantry Regiment (w/ 3 Infantry Battalions), Reinforced
48 Amphibious Assault Vehicles, AAV-7A1 and variants (1 Amphibious Assault Vehicle Company (Reinforced))
27 Light Armored Vehicles, LAV-25A1 and variants (1 Light Armored Reconnaissance Company (Reinforced))
14 Main Battle Tank, M1A1, Abrams (1 Tank Company (Reinforced))
2 Armored Recovery Vehicle, M88A2, Hercules (1 Tank Company (Reinforced))
2 Assault Breacher Vehicle, M1, Shredder (Combat Engineer Company)
24 Howitzer, 155 mm, M777A2 (1 Artillery Battalion w/4 firing batteries of 6 guns each)
24 Mortar, 81mm, M252 (4 tubes per section, 2 sections per platoon, of the Mortar Platoon, Weapons Company, Infantry Battalion × 3)
27 Lightweight Mortar, 60 mm, M224 LWCMS (3 tubes in the Mortar Section of the Weapons Platoon, Rifle company × 3, Infantry Battalion × 3)
24 Anti-Tank Missile Launcher, BGM-71, TOW (8 launchers in the TOW Section of the Anti-Tank (AT) Platoon, Weapons Company, Infantry Battalion × 3)
24 Anti-Tank Missile Launcher, FGM-148, Javelin (8 launchers in the AT Section of the Anti-Tank Platoon, Weapons Company, Infantry Battalion × 3)
18 Automatic Grenade Launcher, 40 mm, Mk 19 (6 guns per Heavy Machine Gun Platoon, Weapons Company, Infantry Battalion × 3)
18 Browning Machine Gun, Cal. .50, M2, HB, Flexible (6 guns per Heavy Machine Gun Platoon, Weapons Company, Infantry Battalion × 3)
54 Machine Gun, 7.62mm,  M240 (6 guns in the Machine Gun Section, Weapons Platoon, Rifle Company × 3, Infantry Battalion × 3)
243 Light Machine Gun/Infantry Automatic Rifle, 5.56mm, M249 (9 guns per Rifle Platoon × 3, Rifle Company × 3, Infantry Battalion × 3)

Aviation combat element (ACE)

Composite Marine aircraft group
Marine Aircraft Group (MAG) [notional organization shown below] 
45 AV-8B (3 VMA squadrons w/ 15 aircraft each) 
24 F/A-18 (2 VMFA squadrons w/ 12 aircraft each) 
5 EA-6B (1 VMAQ squadron w/ 5 aircraft each)
6 KC-130 (1 VMGR detachment)
32 CH-53E (2 HMH squadrons w/ 16 aircraft each)
48 CH-46E or MV-22B (4 HMM or VMM squadrons w/ 12 aircraft each) 
18 AH-1Z (1 HMLA squadron, each HMLA squadron contains both AH-1 & UH-1 aircraft)
9 UH-1Y (1 HMLA squadron, each HMLA squadron contains both AH-1 & UH-1 aircraft)
45 Stinger missile teams (1 Low Altitude Air Defense firing battery w/ 3 platoons of 15 Stinger missile teams each)
 1 Marine Aviation Logistics Squadron (MALS) (Provides Aircraft Intermediate Maintenance, Aviation Supply, and Aviation Ordnance support to aircraft squadrons)
 1 Marine Wing Support Squadron (MWSS) (Provides Combat Service Support [i.e., all essential aviation ground support and services] to enable the MAG to perform its aviation mission)
 Other aviation support squadron detachments as required (MACS, MASS, MTACS, MWCS)

Logistics combat element (LCE)

Combat logistics regiment (CLR) (w/ 1 to 3 combat logistics Battalions) [notional equipment shown below]
1 medium girder bridge
6 cranes:
1 30-ton crane
5 7.5-ton cranes
2 600k-gal fuel systems
44 100-kW generators
75  7-ton trucks
9 Water purifying units
116 forklifts
5 bulldozers
3 road graders

List of MEBs

 1st Marine Expeditionary Brigade
 2nd Marine Expeditionary Brigade
 3rd Marine Expeditionary Brigade
 5th Marine Expeditionary Brigade
 7th Marine Expeditionary Brigade

Historical MEBs
The following MEBs were deployed operationally:
Task Force Tarawa for the Iraq War
Task Force Leatherneck for the Afghanistan War
9th Marine Expeditionary Brigade for the Vietnam War – deployed March 8, 1965
 4th Marine Expeditionary Brigade (Anti-Terrorism) for the War on Terror - activated in 29 October 2001 and deactivated in February 2006

Notes

Expeditionary